Spyker may refer to:
 Spyker, a former Dutch car manufacturer
 Spyker Cars, a modern Dutch car manufacturer
 Spyker F1, a former Formula One team created by Spyker Cars
 Spyker, a village in Germany; see Glowe

See also
 Spiker (disambiguation)